Appletons' Cyclopædia of American Biography is a six-volume collection of biographies of notable people involved in the history of the New World. Published between 1887 and 1889, its unsigned articles were widely accepted as authoritative for several decades. Later the encyclopedia became notorious for including dozens of biographies of people who had never existed. In nearly all articles about the Cyclopædia various authors have erroneously spelled the title as 'Appleton's Cyclopædia of American Biography', placing the apostrophe in the wrong place.

Overview
The Cyclopædia included the names of over 20,000 native and adopted citizens of the United States, including living persons.  Also included were the names of several thousand citizens of all the other countries of North and South America. The aim was to embrace all noteworthy persons of the New World. The work also contained the names of nearly 1,000 people of foreign birth who were closely identified with American history. The Cyclopædia was illustrated with about sixty full-page portraits supplemented by some 1,500 smaller vignette portraits accompanied by facsimile autographs, and also several hundred views of birthplaces, residences, monuments, and tombs famous in history.

None of the articles are signed either with names or with initials. The clue to authorship is obtained, when obtained at all, through a list of contributors and their contributions arranged alphabetically as to contributors. One reviewer found this a rather inconvenient method, complaining that the finding of the author of a particular sketch often involved a voyage of discovery through the entire list. These lists are searched in vain, however, for the authors of many sketches, including the one of President Grover Cleveland.

Fictitious biographies
Appletons' Cyclopædia is notorious for including an unknown number of biographies of fictitious persons.
The first to discover these fictions was John Hendley Barnhart in 1919 when he  identified and reprinted, with commentary, 14 biographical sketches of supposed European botanists who had come to the New World to study in Latin America. By 1939, 47 fictitious biographies had been discovered, though only the letters H and V had been systematically investigated. The status of fictions in Appletons' Cyclopædia was assessed by Margaret Castle Schindler of Goucher College in 1937. According to Schindler,
The writer (or writers) of these articles must have had some scientific training, for most of the creations were scientists, and sufficient linguistic knowledge to have invented or adapted titles in six languages. He was certainly familiar with the history and geography of South America. Most of the places visited by his characters are real places, and most of the historical events in which they participated are genuine. However, he sometimes made mistakes by which his fraudulent work can be detected.

Some, such as Huet de Navarre, were about a real person but in most details were fictional.
Joseph Cantillion identifies the author of "phantom Jesuit" articles as William Christian Tenner, and identifies 43 wholly fictitious subjects of this genre, along with a much fictionalised biography of Rafael Ferrer. Dobson suggests Hermann Ritter, who appears as the source of "Articles on South and Central Americans" beginning with volume III, as a likely author of the fictitious articles. Dobson notes that the first two volumes, where Juan G. Puron appears in this role, are practically free of problem articles, although Barnhart identifies the article on "Dávila, Nepomuceno" as suspicious, but not fictitious beyond a shadow of a doubt.

Contributors to Appletons' Cyclopædia were free to suggest new subjects and were paid according to the length of the article. Articles were only checked for form by the editorial staff. While conceding that Appletons' Cyclopædia was a "valuable and authoritative work", and that her results should not reflect on the many authentic articles, Schindler noted that articles on Latin American subjects should be used cautiously until verified against other sources.

Precedents
Appletons' Cyclopædia incorporated Francis S. Drake's Dictionary of American Biography (not to be confused with the more comprehensive 20th century Dictionary of American Biography). Drake's Dictionary was published in 1872 with 10,000 biographies. He worked on a second edition but died in 1885 without completing it. His first edition, original material, latest corrections, and all material he had gathered for the new edition were used in Appletons'''.

Editions
The first edition of the Cyclopædia was published between 1887 and 1889 by D. Appleton and Company of New York City.  The general editors were James Grant Wilson and John Fiske; the managing editor from 1886 to 1888 was Rossiter Johnson. A seventh volume, containing an appendix and supplementary lists, and thematic indexes to the whole work, was issued in 1901.

The Cyclopædia was republished, uncorrected, by the Gale Research Company in 1968.

 See also 
 The National Cyclopaedia of American Biography Universal CyclopaediaNotes

 References 

 Further reading 
  (This is a summary of Barnhart's article.)

 External links 

 Appletons' Cyclopædia'' at Internet Archive – full views of 4 volumes
 Volume I. AARON–CRANDALL (1887) - facsimile
 Volume II.  CRANE–GRIMSHAW (1887) - facsimile
 Volume III. GRINNELL–LOCKWOOD (1887) - facsimile
 Volume IV. LODGE–PICKENS (1887) – facsimile
 Volume V. PICKERING–SUMTER (Revised Edition, 1900)
 Volume VI. SUNDERLAND–ZURITA with Supplement and Analytical Index (1889) – 1968 facsimile
 Appletons' Cyclopædia as 7 volumes at HathiTrust Digital Library – "Note: Vol. 7, a supplementary volume, edited by J.G. Wilson, is the same as v. 7 of the 1898–1900 Revised Edition"

1887 non-fiction books
1888 non-fiction books
1889 non-fiction books
1901 non-fiction books
United States biographical dictionaries
Fictitious entries
Reference works in the public domain
D. Appleton & Company books
Written fiction presented as fact